Dial Hard is the second studio album released by the hard rock band Gotthard.

The album peaked at #1 on the Swiss Charts and was certified as platinum for exceeding 30,000 sales.

Track listing
All songs written by Steve Lee/Leo Leoni/Chris von Rohr except where noted.

 "Higher" – 4:32
 "Mountain Mama" – 3:52
 "Here Comes the Heat" – 3:01
 "She Goes Down" – 4:52
 "I'm Your Travelin' Man" – 5:25 (Jimi Jamison/Mandy Meyer/Tommy Andris)
 "Love For Money" – 3:40
 "Get It While You Can" – 5:42
 "Come Together" – 4:47 (John Lennon/Paul McCartney)
 "Dirty Devil Rock" – 4:15
 "Open Fire" – 4:56
 "I'm On My Way" – 5:57
Asian version (BMG BVCP-692) adds the following
 "Good Time Lover" (Live version) – 5:16
 "Rock and Roll" (Live version) – 4:45 (Jimmy Page/John Paul Jones/Robert Plant/John Bonham)
Track 5 originally recorded by Cobra on the album First Strike
Track 8 originally recorded by The Beatles on the album Abbey Road
Track 13 originally recorded by Led Zeppelin on the album Led Zeppelin IV

Personnel
Steve Lee – vocals 
Leo Leoni – guitars and vocals
Marc Lynn – bass guitar
Hena Habegger – drums

Guests:
Pat Regan – keyboards
Steve Bishop – lead guitar (Tracks 5 & 11)
Steve Bailey – bass guitar (Tracks 9 & 11)

Production
 Produced by Chris von Rohr
Mixing – Phil Kaffel

Charts

Weekly charts

Year-end charts

References

External links
Heavy Harmonies page

Gotthard (band) albums
1994 albums